The following is a list of awards and nominations received by American actress, comedian, writer, producer, and playwright Tina Fey.

Fey is best known for her comedic work on the NBC sketch series Saturday Night Live, the NBC sitcom 30 Rock, and the Netflix sitcom Unbreakable Kimmy Schmidt. She has won nine Primetime Emmy Awards, three Golden Globe Awards, five Screen Actors Guild Awards, seven Writers Guild Awards, three Producers Guild Awards, and has been nominated for a Grammy Award and a Tony Award. 

In 2008, she received the AP Entertainer of the Year award from the Associated Press. In 2010, Fey was awarded the Mark Twain Prize for American Humor, becoming the youngest-ever recipient of the award, and it was announced that she would receive a star on the Hollywood Walk of Fame in 2011. In 2018, Fey was the recipient of the Herb Sargent Award for Comedy Excellence from the Writers Guild of America together with frequent collaborator Robert Carlock.

Major awards

Emmy Awards

Golden Globe Awards

Grammy Awards

Tony Awards

Guild awards

Producers Guild of America Awards

Screen Actors Guild Awards

Writers Guild of America Awards

Other awards

Alliance of Women Film Journalists' EDA Female Focus Awards

Critics' Choice Movie Awards

Critics' Choice Super Awards

Critics' Choice Television Awards

Drama Desk Awards

Gay and Lesbian Entertainment Critics Association

Golden Nymph Award

Gotham Awards

Gracie Awards

Hollywood Critics Association Awards

MTV Movie Awards

Muse Awards

NewNowNext Awards

Nickelodeon Kids' Choice Awards

Outer Critics Circle Awards

People's Choice Awards

Satellite Awards

Teen Choice Awards

Television Critics Association Awards

Washington D.C. Area Film Critics Association Awards

References

External links
 

Lists of awards received by American actor